In anatomy, the tomium is the sharp cutting edge of the beak of a bird or the bill of a turtle. Sometimes the edge is serrated for tearing through flesh or vegetation.

See also

 Culmen (bird)
 Gonys

References

Vertebrate anatomy